Thai Veedu is a 2017-2018 Tamil-language family drama starring Sanghavi, Vishwa, Karna and J. Lalitha. It started aired on Vendhar TV from 23 October 2017 to 27 April 2018 on every Monday to Friday for 134 Episodes. The show is produced, Story and directed by Mangai Harirajan.

Plot
Police officer Durga discovers the bitter truth about her father's death. She decides to bring justice as well teach a lesson to her arrogant uncles, who had brutally murdered her father.

Cast
 Sanghavi as Durga: An elder daughter of Meenakshi and police officer. She fights for their mother's rights and returns to the village.
 J. Lalitha as Meenakshi: A widow and Durga and Shalini's mother. She eloped with one of the workers and gets married. They have two daughters. But the family finds and kills her husband, and starts looking for their daughter and her kids, too.
 Vishwa as Chinnathurai
 Karna
 Poomika as Shalini
 C. Ranganathan
 Vijayalakshmi
 Uma Sankar Babu
 Vetri
 Jayagi
 Kosava
 Sathya
 Mithun
 Manikandan
 Ranjith
 Piraksh
 Parthasarathy

Casting
The series is a Village revenge story produced by Mangai Harirajan under the banner Mangai Entertainments that airs on Vendhar TV. Sanghavi who was also cast in Mangai Harirajan's movies, was selected to portray the lead role of police officer Durga. Sangavi made his comeback after Kaalabairavan. Vishwa and Vijayalakshmi as the main antagonist.

International broadcast
The series was released on 23 October 2017 on Vendhar TV. The show was also broadcast internationally on the channel's international distribution.
 It aired Sri Lanka, Singapore and Malaysia on Vendhar TV.
 The United States, Europe, North America and Canada on ATN Tamil Plus on Monday to Friday at 20:00. After original telecast.

References

External links
 Vendhar TV Website 

Vendhar TV television series
Tamil-language police television series
2010s Tamil-language television series
2017 Tamil-language television series debuts
Tamil-language television shows
2018 Tamil-language television series endings